"Saturday Night Hustle" is the second single released from Sway's second album The Signature LP. It features R&B singer Lemar. The song was produced by Al Shux, who has worked with Sway before. The single was released on 15 September 2008. It spent one week on the UK Singles Chart, peaking at number 67.

According to the DVD release of The Signature LP, "Saturday Night Hustle" was written during the production of Sway's debut album This Is My Demo, but was omitted from the album's track list as he believed it was not appropriate for the album.

Track listing
 "Saturday Night Hustle (Album Version)" - 3:24
 "Saturday Night Hustle (Jukey Club Remix)" - 6:09
 "Saturday Night Hustle (Instrumental)" - 3:23

References

2008 singles
2008 songs
Sway (musician) songs
Song recordings produced by Al Shux
Songs written by Sway (musician)